A mare (in Old High German, Old Norse, and Swedish) is a malicious entity in Germanic and Slavic folklore that rides on people's chests while they sleep, bringing on nightmares.

Etymology 
The -mar in French  ('nightmare') is borrowed from the Germanic through Old French .

Most scholars trace the word back to the reconstructed Proto-Indo-European root , associated with crushing, pressing and oppressing. or according to other sources 'to rub away' or 'to harm'. However, other etymologies have been suggested. For example, Éva Pócs saw the term as being cognate with the Greek  (Indo-European ), meaning 'doom'. There is no definite answer among historians about the time of origin of the word. According to the philologist Yeleazar Meletinsky, the Proto-Slavonic root  passed into the Germanic language no later than the 1st century BC.

The Icelandic word  has the same meaning ( from the verb , 'trample', 'stamp on', related to tread), whereas the Swedish  translates as 'mare-dream'.

Beliefs 

The mare was believed to ride horses, which left them exhausted and covered in sweat by the morning. The belief probably originated as an explanation to the Polish plait phenomenon, a hair disease.

Even trees were thought to be ridden by the mare, resulting in branches being entangled.

According to Paul Devereux, mares included witches who took on the form of animals when their spirits went out and about while they were in trance (see the Icelandic example of Geirrid, below). These included animals such as frogs, cats, horses, hares, dogs, oxen, birds and often bees and wasps.

By region

Scandinavia
The mare is attested as early as in the Norse Ynglinga saga from the 13th century. Here, King Vanlandi Sveigðisson of Uppsala lost his life to a nightmare conjured by the Finnish sorceress Huld or Hulda, hired by the king's abandoned wife Drífa. The king had broken his promise to return within three years, and after ten years had elapsed the wife engaged the sorceress to either lure the king back to her, or failing that, to assassinate him. Vanlandi had scarcely gone to sleep when he complained that the nightmare "rode him"; when the men held the king's head it "trod on his legs" on the point of breaking, and when the retinue then "seized his feet", the creature fatally "pressed down on his head". In Sámi mythology, there is an evil elf called Deattán, who transforms into a bird or other animal and sits on the chests of sleeping people, giving nightmares.

According to the Vatnsdæla saga, Thorkel Silver has a dream about riding a red horse that barely touched ground, which he interpreted as a positive omen, but his wife disagreed, explaining that a mare signified a man's fetch (fylgja), and that the red color boded bloodiness.

Another possible example is the account in the Eyrbyggja saga of the sorceress Geirrid accused of assuming the shape of a "night-rider" or "ride-by-night" ( or ) and causing serious trampling bruises on Gunnlaug Thorbjornsson.

Germany 

German Folklorist Franz Felix Adalbert Kuhn records a Westphalian charm or prayer used to ward off mares, from Wilhelmsburg near Paderborn:

Such charms are preceded by the example of the Münchener Nachtsegen of the fourteenth century (See Elf under §Medieval and early modern German texts).

Slavic

Poland 

Etymologically, Polish  is connected to Mara/Marzanna, a demon/goddess of winter. It could be a soul of a person (alive or dead) such as a sinful woman, someone wronged or someone who died without confession. Other signs of someone being a mare could be: being the seventh daughter, having one's name pronounced in a wrong way while being baptised, having multicoloured eyes or a unibrow (exclusive to the Kalisz region, Poland). If a woman was promised to marry a man, but then he married another, the rejected one could also become a mare at night. The mare can turn into animals and objects, such as cats, frogs, yarn, straw or apples. People believed that the mare drained people – as well as cattle and horses – of energy and/or blood at night.

Protection practices included:

 drinking coffee before sleeping,
 taking the mare's hat,
 throwing a piece of a noose at the demon,
 sleeping with a leather, wedding belt or a scythe,
 inviting the mare for breakfast,
 changing one's sleeping position,
 smearing feces on the front door,
 leaving a bundle of hay in one's bed and going to sleep in another room.

To protect livestock, some people hung mirrors over the manger (to scare the mare with its own face) or affixed dead birds of prey to the stable doors. Sometimes the horses were given red ribbons, or covered in a stinking substance.

Other 
A Czech  denotes a kind of elf or spirit as well as a sphinx moth or "night butterfly". Other Slavic languages with cognates that have the double meaning of moth are: Kashubian , and Slovak .

In the northwest and south Russian traditions, the mara is a female character, similar to kikimora. Usually invisible, it can take the form of a black woman with long shaggy hair, which she combs, sitting on a yarn.

In Croatian,  refers to a 'nightmare'. Mora or Mara is one of the spirits from ancient Slav mythology, a dark one who becomes a beautiful woman to visit men in their dreams, torturing them with desire before killing them. In Romania they were known as Moroi.

To repel s, children are advised to look at the window or to turn the pillow and make the sign of the cross on it; in the early 19th century, Vuk Karadžić mentions that people would repel s by leaving a broom upside down behind their doors, or putting their belt on top of their sheets, or saying an elaborate prayer poem before they go to sleep.

See also 
 Alp (folklore)
 Basty
 Batibat
 Enchanted Moura
 Ghosts in Thai culture
 Incubus
 Lietuvēns
 Madam Koi Koi
 Mara (demon)
 Mara (Hindu goddess)
 Marzanna (Slavic goddess of death and winter)
 Maya (illusion)
 Moroi
 Moros
 Mouros
 Night hag
 Nightmare
 Pesanta
 Sleep paralysis, medical term for the condition the mare is thought to originate from.
 Slavic fairies
 Succubus

Fiction:
 Paranormal Entity, a 2009 found-footage film featuring a mare named Maron as the antagonist
 Marianne, a 2011 Swedish horror film featuring mares
 Borgman, a 2013 Dutch thriller film featuring mares
Outlast, a 2013 video game featuring Mares/Alps
 Hilda, a 2018 TV series. Episode 6 "The Nightmare Spirit" focuses on one
 Mara, a 2018 American horror film
Phasmophobia, a 2020 video game featuring Mares

Notes

General references 

 Bjordvand, Harald and Lindeman, Fredrik Otto (2007). Våre arveord. Novus. .
 Devereux, Paul (2001). Haunted Land: Investigations into Ancient Mysteries and Modern Day Phenomena, Piatkus Publishers.
  
 Hødnebø, Finn and Magerøy, Hallvard (eds.) (1979). Snorres kongesagaer 1, 2nd ed. Gyldendal Norsk Forlag. .
 
 Pickett, Joseph P. et al. (eds.) (2000). The American Heritage Dictionary of the English Language, 4th ed. Boston: Houghton Mifflin. .

Further reading
 Barešin, Sandra. "Mora kao nadnaravno biće tradicijske kulture" [Mare as Supernatural Being of Traditional Culture]. In: Ethnologica Dalmatica br. 20 (2013): 39-68. https://hrcak.srce.hr/107477
 Batten, Caroline R. “Dark Riders: Disease, Sexual Violence, and Gender Performance in the Old English Mære and Old Norse Mara.” In: The Journal of English and Germanic Philology 120, no. 3 (2021): 352–80. https://www.jstor.org/stable/10.5406/jenglgermphil.120.3.0352.

German legendary creatures
Scandinavian legendary creatures
Scandinavian folklore
English folklore
Slavic legendary creatures
Sleep in mythology and folklore
Supernatural legends
Germanic legendary creatures